This is a list of episodes from the twenty-first season of Real Time with Bill Maher. The season premiered on January 20, 2023. On February 3, the post-show Overtime segment was added as part of the CNN Tonight programming airing Friday nights at 11:30 pm EST.

Episodes

References

External links
 
 HBO.com page

Real Time with Bill Maher seasons
2023 American television seasons
Television series impacted by the COVID-19 pandemic